Ralph Cooper (January 16, 1908 – August 4, 1992), was an American actor, screenwriter, dancer and choreographer. Cooper is best known as the original master of ceremonies and founder of amateur night at the Apollo Theater in Harlem, New York City, in 1935. He wrote, produced, directed and acted in ten motion pictures. Titles include, The Duke Is Tops, Dark Manhattan, Gangsters on the Loose and Gang War. Because of his debonair good looks, he was known as "dark Gable" in the 1930s.

Biography
Cooper was born on January 16, 1908, in Harlem, New York City. He worked as a dancer in small downtown clubs near New York University, which he attended with plans of becoming a medical doctor. In July 1935, Cooper began the Apollo's Amateur Night which ran every Wednesday night. In 1937, Cooper formed Cooper-Randol Productions with black actor George Randol and soon afterwards Million Dollar Productions with white producers Harry Popkin and his brother Leo Popkin to produce race films that he often starred in, wrote, produced and directed. Tino Balio has written that: "Million Dollar, more than any other company, moved black filmmaking away from a marginalized form towards the mainstream, advancing considerably its reputation and ability to attract audiences."

Later life and death
The Apollo closed in the mid–1970s, but the contest was restarted in 1985 after the renovations were completed. Cooper was again the master of ceremonies. His son, Ralph Cooper II, took over the show after his father was hospitalized with cancer in late–1986. He died on August 4, 1992, from cancer. Cooper is interred in Woodlawn Cemetery in The Bronx, New York City.

References

External links

1908 births
1992 deaths
Male actors from New York City
American male film actors
American male screenwriters
20th-century American screenwriters
20th-century American male actors
20th-century American male writers
Screenwriters from New York (state)
Writers from Manhattan
People from Harlem
Deaths from cancer in New York (state)
Burials at Woodlawn Cemetery (Bronx, New York)
African-American screenwriters
African-American male actors
20th-century African-American writers
African-American male writers